Chwałowice may refer to the following places in Poland:
Chwałowice, Lower Silesian Voivodeship (south-west Poland)
Chwałowice, Świętokrzyskie Voivodeship (south-central Poland)
Chwałowice, Subcarpathian Voivodeship (south-east Poland)
Chwałowice, Masovian Voivodeship (east-central Poland)
Chwałowice, Lubusz Voivodeship (west Poland)
Chwałowice, Rybnik in Silesian Voivodeship (south Poland)